Edwin Denby may refer to:

 Edwin Denby (poet) (1903–1983), U.S. poet, novelist, dance critic
 Edwin Denby (politician) (1870–1929), U.S. politician, Secretary of Navy, noted in the Teapot Dome Scandal